Mihails Ziziļevs (born 27 December 1973) is a Latvian football midfielder who currently plays for FK Klaipėdos Granitas in the Lithuanian A Lyga.

Playing career
Ziziļevs started his career at his local club DJSS Daugavpils in the early 1990s. Until 2000 he played in his hometown, but then got an offer from Russian Premier League club Rubin Kazan. After two seasons in Russia Ziziļevs came back to Daugavpils and joined its local club Dinaburg FC. After a few seasons in Latvia Ziziļevs moved back to Russia, where he played for Metallurg Lipetsk and later also Luch-Energiya Vladivostok. Afterwards Ziziļevs came back to Dinaburg FC once more and after a very successful season he joined FK Ventspils, where playing for 3 seasons, he helped the club win the Latvian Higher League in 2006. In 2010 Ziziļevs joined FC Daugava. In 2012, as the club's captain, he helped Daugava win the Latvian Higher League for the first time in the club's history. In 2013 they also lifted the first ever Latvian Supercup. On 6 April 2013 Ziziļevs played his 400th game in the Latvian Higher League and was locally referred to as the Latvian Ryan Giggs. In March 2014, when his contract with Daugava had expired, Ziziļevs moved to the Lithuanian A Lyga side FK Klaipėdos Granitas to continue his professional footballer's career, at the time being 40 years old.

Awards
 Champion of Latvia - 2006, 2007, 2008, 2012
 Latvian Cup winner - 2007
 Latvian Supercup winner - 2013

References

External links

1973 births
Living people
Sportspeople from Daugavpils
Latvian people of Russian descent
Latvian footballers
Latvia international footballers
Latvian Higher League players
FK Ventspils players
FK Liepājas Metalurgs players
Dinaburg FC players
FC Rubin Kazan players
Latvian expatriate footballers
Latvian expatriate sportspeople in Russia
FC Luch Vladivostok players
FC Metallurg Lipetsk players
FC Daugava players
Expatriate footballers in Lithuania
Latvian expatriate sportspeople in Lithuania
Association football midfielders